Diego Ribera de Toledo  (died 6 February 1543) was a Roman Catholic prelate who served as Bishop of Segovia (1511–1543) and Bishop of Mallorca (1507–1508).

Biography
On 22 December 1507, Diego Ribera de Toledo was appointed by the King of Spain and confirmed by Pope Julius II as Bishop of Mallorca. In 1508, he was consecrated bishop by Adrianus Appelkeren, Titular Bishop of Sebaste in Cilicia. On 29 October 1511, he was appointed by Pope Julius II as Bishop of Segovia. He served as Bishop of Segovia until his death on 6 February 1543. While bishop, he was the principal consecrator of Adriaan Florenszoom Dedel, Bishop of Tortosa; and Juan de Zumárraga, Bishop of México.

References

External links and additional sources
 (for Chronology of Bishops) 
 (for Chronology of Bishops) 
 (for Chronology of Bishops) 
 (for Chronology of Bishops) 

1543 deaths
16th-century Roman Catholic bishops in Spain
Bishops appointed by Pope Julius II
University of Salamanca alumni
Academic staff of the University of Salamanca